Acroneuria abnormis, the common stone, is a species of common stonefly in the family Perlidae. It is found in North America.
 During mating, pairs engage in drumming behavior that can be used to identify species.

References

External links

 

Perlidae
Articles created by Qbugbot
Insects described in 1838